Arvesen is a surname of Norwegian origin which may refer to:

Jan Arvesen (1931–2000), Norwegian diplomat
Kristian Arvesen (1883 – after 1937), Norwegian politician for the Centre Party  
Kurt Asle Arvesen (born 1975), Norwegian professional road bicycle racer for Team Sky
Nina Arvesen (born 1961), American actress of Norwegian extraction 
Olaus Arvesen (1830–1917), Norwegian educator and politician for the Liberal Party of Norway

Norwegian-language surnames